Jacobus ("Jack") Cornelius Rosendaal (born September 12, 1973 in Apeldoorn, Gelderland) is a retired decathlete from the Netherlands, who represented his native country at the 1996 Summer Olympics in Atlanta, United States. There he finished in 21st place in the men's decathlon competition, earning a total number of 8.035 points. The other competitor from the Netherlands, Marcel Dost, ended up in 18th position, collecting 8.111 points.

Achievements

References
  Dutch Olympic Committee

1973 births
Living people
Dutch decathletes
Olympic athletes of the Netherlands
Athletes (track and field) at the 1996 Summer Olympics
Sportspeople from Apeldoorn
20th-century Dutch people